Hruške is a former settlement in the Municipality of Moravče in central Slovenia. It is now part of the village of Limbarska Gora. The area is part of the traditional region of Upper Carniola. The municipality is now included in the Central Slovenia Statistical Region.

Geography
Hruške lies in the central part of the village of Limbarska Gora, below the south slope of the hill ascending to the main settlement.

History
Hruške had a population of 20 living in four houses in 1900. Hruške was annexed by Limbarska Gora (at that time still called Sveti Valentin) in 1952, ending its existence as an independent settlement.

References

External links

Hruške on Geopedia

Populated places in the Municipality of Moravče
Former settlements in Slovenia